Stephanie Moulton Sarkis is an author who has written six self-help books.

Self-help books 
Sarkis is the author of the following books:

Biography 
Stephanie Moulton Sarkis is a self-help author.

She has blog articles posted in Psychology Today, Forbes and Huffington Post. She writes about autism spectrum disorder and anxiety disorders, and their impact on college performance and personal finance. Sarkis' experience with having ADHD herself is profiled in the book The Gift of Adult ADD by Lara Honos-Webb.

In graduate school, Sarkis was a co-recipient of an American Psychological Association Outstanding Dissertation Award; the study was subsequently published in the Journal of Attention Disorders. In 2002, she received a PhD in mental health counseling from the University of Florida, and is an American Mental Health Counselors Association Diplomate and Clinical Specialist in Child and Adolescent Counseling. Her professional qualifications include Licensed Mental Health Counselor and National Certified Counselor.

References 

CNN interview
Radio interviews

External links
Huffington Post blog
Psychology Today blog
10 Percent Happier podcast episode #138, Dr. Stephanie Sarkis, Meditating While Having ADHD"

Living people
People from West Allis, Wisconsin
University of Florida College of Education alumni
American psychology writers
Year of birth missing (living people)